Dániel Jankovics (born 1 March 1995) is a Hungarian track and field athlete who competes in the high jump. He holds a personal best of 2.24 metres for the event. He represented his country at the 2021 European Athletics Indoor Championships, finishing eighth. He is a multiple Hungarian national champion, including wins indoors in 2020 and 2021, and outdoors in 2019 and 2020. Earlier in his career he took part in combined track and field events, and completed he octathlon at the 2012 Hungarian under-18s championship.

International competitions

National titles
Hungarian Athletics Championships
High jump: 2019, 2020
Hungarian Indoor Athletics Championships
High jump: 2020, 2021

References

External links

1995 births
Living people
Hungarian male high jumpers
Hungarian Athletics Championships winners